The  Denver Dynamite season was the fourth, and what would be the final, season for the Arena Football League franchise. Despite the financial turmoil that occurred the season before, the Dynamite once again fielded a team in 1991. The team finished 6–4 during the regular season, again clinching the 3rd seed for the playoffs. The team lost to the relocated Gladiators, who became the Tampa Bay Storm, in the semi-finals.  After the season, the franchise filed for bankruptcy after being sued by their public relations firm. When he learned of the situation in Denver, AFL commissioner, Jim Foster has this to say, "Three things can happen. One, he finds a buyer, or we find him a buyer, and the team stays in Denver. Two, a buyer is found and moves to another city. Three, no one is interested and the franchise goes down." The Dynamite went up for sale, but with the city trying to attract investors to land a Major League Baseball franchise (Colorado Rockies), the team did not attract potential buyers.

Regular season

Schedule

Standings

y – clinched regular-season title

x – clinched playoff spot

Playoffs

Roster

References

External links
 1991 Denver Dynamite page at ArenaFan.com

Denver Dynamite
Denver Dynamite
Denver Dynamite (arena football) seasons